Alison Cottrell,  is the CEO of the Banking Standards Board and formerly a British civil servant who worked for HM Treasury as joint Director for Financial Services and Director for Corporate Services, in which capacity she was a member of the Board of the department. She was appointed Companion of the Order of the Bath (CB) in the 2015 New Year Honours.

References 

British civil servants
Companions of the Order of the Bath
HM Treasury
Year of birth missing (living people)
Living people
Place of birth missing (living people)